Asteromyrtus angustifolia is a species of plant in the myrtle family Myrtaceae that is endemic to north-eastern Queensland, Australia.

Description
The species grows as a shrub or small tree up to about 6 m in height, with a diameter rarely more than 30 cm. The bark is finely layered. The leaves are about 25–60 mm long by 3–6 mm wide, and very aromatic when crushed. The flowers are cream to pink, with spherical inflorescences, the petals 3–6 mm long. The round fruits are about 10–20 mm in diameter.

Distribution and habitat
The species is found is north-east Queensland, including the Cape York Peninsula. It grows on the sandy soils of dunes and sand hills, in monsoon forest or vine thickets, at an altitude from near sea level to 150 m.

References

 

angustifolia
Myrtales of Australia
Flora of Queensland
Endemic flora of Australia
Plants described in 1788